Bascharage is a town and a former commune in south-western Luxembourg. Since 2012, it is part of the commune of Käerjeng.

History 
Bascharage with the other towns like Linger, Hautcharage, and Pétange were owned by the "Hoheit Kerschen". The first known reference to them was on April 4, 1281, for obtaining their freedom under the law of Beamont "Freiheitsbrief nach Böhmerrecht". The freedom of Clemency probably happened in 1260.

After the occupation of France (1794 – 1815), the "Hoheit Kerschen" changed in "municipalité cantonale Bascharage" with the townships of Bascharage, Clemency, Mamer, Garnich, and Dippach. This township came out in 1799 as the "Mairie de Bascharage" with the towns of Bascharage, Hautchaurage, and Linger. Their first mayor was Pierre Clemont in 1800. The first mayor of Clemency was Pierre Decker (until 1830).

Geologically, Bascharage does not belong to the Minette ore region. However, the area has a historical and sometimes tense relationship with the iron industry. The steel crisis of the 1970s was responsible for the loss of many jobs.

Even so, the town has known regular development with the arrival of enterprises like General Motors and Luxguard. In Bascharage is also the headquarters of the nation's largest brewery, Brasserie Nationale, brewers of Bofferding beer.

The old township Bascharage

Until 2012, Bascharage was in a separate commune similarly named Bascharage. But on 1 January 2012, the Commune of Bascharage was merged with the Commune of Clemency with the combined township being named the Commune of Käerjeng. The law creating Käerjeng was passed on 24 May 2011.

Former commune 
The former commune consisted of the villages:

 Bascharage
 Hautcharage
 Linger

Amorial Bearings 
The arms were conferred on the town by Grand Ducal decree of 21 July 1969.

Mayors since 1858 
Jean Nicolas Schumacher
Pierre Schütz
Jules Hemmer
Jean Peschong
Théophile Aubart
Nicolas Meyers
Robert Steichen
Marcel Gillen
André Siebenbour
Joseph Thill
Jean Christophe
Jeannot Halsdorf
Michel Wolter

Geography 
Bascharage is crossed by the Chiers, which is fed by the Mierbech.

Gemeng Käerjeng (commune of Käerjeng)

Bascharage is now part of the commune of Käerjeng (in Luxembourgish Gemeng Käerjeng), one of the 106 communes in the Grand Duchy of Luxembourg and situated in the south-west of the country in the canton of Capellen.

Before 2012, Bascharage was part of the similarly named Commune of Bacharage. But on 1 January 2012, the Commune of Bacharage was merged with Commune of the Commune of Clemency with the two former communes now forming the merged new commune of Käerjeng. The law creating Käerjeng as a commune was passed on 24 May 2011.

Economy 
Bascharage is home to Brasserie Nationale and its predecessor, Brasserie Bofferding, brewers of Bofferding blond beer. An industrial zone was also born around 30 years ago which, today, regroups local and regional companies from big subsidiaries such as General Motors, Luxguard, and Delphi Corporation.

Sports 
 UN Käerjéng 97 (football)
 HBC Bascharage (handball)
 Bascharage Hedgehogs (basketball)

Notable residents 
Claus Cito (1882–1965), sculptor of the Gëlle Fra war memorial, born in Bascharage

References 

 
Former communes of Luxembourg
Towns in Luxembourg